Kiewia is a genus of flowering plants belonging to the family Araceae.

Its native range is Southern Peninsular Thailand to Western Malesia.

Species:

Kiewia perakensis 
Kiewia ridleyi 
Kiewia teijsmannii

References

Araceae
Araceae genera